Thma Puok is a khum (commune) of Thma Puok District in Banteay Meanchey Province in north-western Cambodia.

It is the capital of Thma Puok District.

Villages

 Thma Puok(ថ្មពួក)
 Neak Ta(អ្នកថា)
 Voat Chas(វត្ដចាស់)
 Kasen(ក្សេន្ត)
 Svay(ស្វាយ)
 Thnal Dach(ថ្នល់ដាច់)
 Anlong Trach(អន្លង់ត្រាច)

References

Communes of Banteay Meanchey province
Thma Puok District